J. P. Nettl (1926–1968) was a historian best known for his two-volume biography of Rosa Luxemburg, which The New York Times described as a classic work that did full justice to her political activity, context, theoretical contributions, and personality.

Works 

 The Eastern Zone and Soviet Policy in Germany (1951)
 Rosa Luxemburg (1966)
 The Soviet Achievement (1967)
 International Systems and the Modernization of Societies (1968, with Roland Robertson)

References 

1926 births
1968 deaths
British biographers
British historians